Michelle Gisin (born 5 December 1993) is a Swiss World Cup alpine ski racer and competes in all disciplines. A two-time Olympic gold medalist, she won the Women's combined event in 2018 Winter Olympics, and Women's combined at the 2022 Winter Olympics. Born in Samedan, Graubünden, Gisin is the younger sister of alpine ski racers Marc and Dominique Gisin.

Career
Gisin has enjoyed success in the Swiss Junior National Championships, finishing third in the downhill in 2011, third in the Super G in 2012 and winning the super combined in 2012. She took a silver medal in the slalom at the FIS Junior World Ski Championships in February 2013. She competed for Switzerland at the 2014 Winter Olympics in the alpine skiing events.

She made a breakthrough at the senior level at a World Cup meeting in Val-d'Isère just before Christmas 2016: she took seventh place in her first World Cup start in downhill and took her first podium finish when she finished second in the combined. Later that season at the World Championships in St. Moritz, Gisin took a silver medal in the combined, finishing behind teammate Wendy Holdener in a one-two finish for the Swiss on home snow.

In December 2017, during her first visit to Lake Louise, Gisin took eighth place in the first of two downhills at the Canadian resort before taking her second World Cup podium in the second downhill the following day, finishing in third. The following week she made a successful return to St. Moritz when she took her first top 10 finish in a super-G, benefiting from an improvement in weather conditions to again finish second as part of a Swiss one-two, this time finishing 0.1 seconds behind Jasmine Flury. She went on to take the gold medal in the combined at the 2018 Winter Olympics, finishing third in the first run of downhill before holding off Mikaela Shiffrin and Holdener in the slalom leg to take the win, following in the footsteps of her sister, who won a gold medal in downhill in the 2014 Games.

Gisin's preparation for the 2021/22 season proved very difficult as she was ill with Pfeiffer's glandular fever in the summer and fall and had to refrain almost completely from training during this time. Despite this significant handicap, she was able to improve continuously throughout the winter and was already back on the podium at the end of December 2021 as the third-place finisher in the Courchevel giant slalom and the Lienz slalom. In January, two more third places were added in the downhill and super-G of Cortina d'Ampezzo. At the 2022 Winter Olympics in Beijing, she won the bronze medal in the giant slalom before repeating her Olympic victory in the combined. Two more third places in the World Cup were added in the slalom of Åre and the super-G of Courchevel.

Personal life
Gisin has been in a relationship with Italian alpine skier Luca De Aliprandini since 2014.

World Cup results

Season standings
{| class="wikitable"  style="font-size:95%; text-align:center; border:gray solid 1px; width:40%;"
|- style="background:#369; color:white;"
| rowspan="2" style="width:6%;"|Season
|- style="background:#4180be; color:white;"
| style="width:3%;"|Age
| style="width:5%;"|Overall
| style="width:5%;"|Slalom
| style="width:5%;"|GiantSlalom
| style="width:5%;"|
| style="width:5%;"|Downhill
| style="width:5%;"|Combined
| style="width:5%;"|Parallel
|-
| 2013 ||19|| 79 || 35 || — || — || — || — || rowspan="7" 
|-
| 2014 ||20|| 82 || 31 || — || — || — || —
|-
| 2015 ||21|| 45 || 18 || 38 || — || — || —
|-
| 2016 ||22|| 44 || 14 || — || — || — || 21
|-
| 2017 ||23||27|| 16 || — || 41 || 28 || 5
|-
| 2018 ||24||7|| 13 || 50 || 4 || 6 || style="background:silver;"|2
|-
| 2019 ||25||16|| 14 || 37 || 24 || 9 || —
|-
| 2020 ||26||8|| 8 || 11 || 17 || 24 || 8 || —
|-
| 2021 ||27|| bgcolor="cc9966"|3|| 4 || 4 || 13 || 15 || rowspan="3"  || —
|-
| 2022 ||28|| 5 || 7 || 8 || 12 || 16 || —
|-
| 2023 ||29||15||19||29||10||16|| 
|}

Race podiums
 1 win – (1 SL)
 19 podiums – (7 SL, 4 DH, 3 GS, 3 SG, 2 AC)

World Championship results

Olympic results

See also
List of Olympic medalist families

References

External links

Michelle Gisin at Swiss Ski Team ''

1993 births
Swiss female alpine skiers
Alpine skiers at the 2014 Winter Olympics
Alpine skiers at the 2018 Winter Olympics
Alpine skiers at the 2022 Winter Olympics
Olympic alpine skiers of Switzerland
Sportspeople from Graubünden
Living people
Medalists at the 2018 Winter Olympics
Medalists at the 2022 Winter Olympics
Olympic medalists in alpine skiing
Olympic gold medalists for Switzerland
Olympic bronze medalists for Switzerland